Otto Ariel Lopez (born October 1, 1998) is a Dominican-Canadian professional baseball infielder for the Toronto Blue Jays of Major League Baseball (MLB). He made his MLB debut in 2021.

Early life
Lopez was born in the Dominican Republic. He was raised in Montreal for many years after his family moved to Canada, where he acquired Canadian citizenship, when he was young due to his father getting a teaching job. He first played organized baseball in Canada after only playing on the streets in Santo Domingo. He lived in Montreal's Tétreaultville neighborhood and during that time tried his hand at hockey, skiing, basketball and badminton.

After just four years, Lopez returned to the Dominican Republic to live with his uncle and train at a small baseball academy, hoping to avoid the Major League Baseball draft and instead sign a more lucrative free agent contract.

Professional career
Lopez signed with the Toronto Blue Jays as an international free agent on July 4, 2016. In 2017, he appeared in 51 games for the Rookie-level Gulf Coast League Blue Jays, and recorded a .275 batting average, one home run, and 15 runs batted in (RBI). Lopez played the 2018 season with the Rookie Advanced Bluefield Blue Jays and the Short Season-A Vancouver Canadians. He played in 58 total games and hit a combined .308 with three home runs, 28 RBI, and 14 stolen bases.

Lopez played his first full season of minor-league baseball in 2019, appearing in 108 games for the Class-A Lansing Lugnuts and batted .324 with five home runs, 50 RBI, and 20 stolen bases. In the offseason, Lopez played 13 games for the Leones del Escogido of the Dominican Professional Baseball League (LIDOM). The 2020 minor-league season was cancelled due to the COVID-19 pandemic. He returned to the Leones during the 2020–21 offseason, appearing in 18 games and batting .254.

On November 20, 2020, Lopez was added to the Blue Jays' 40-man roster to protect him from the Rule 5 draft. He split time during the 2021 season with the Double-A New Hampshire Fisher Cats and Triple-A Buffalo Bisons, batting a combined .315 in 113 games. On August 17, 2021, Lopez made his major-league debut against the Washington Nationals, striking out in his only at-bat. During the 2021–22 offseason he again played in LIDOM, batting .231 in 17 games for Gigantes del Cibao.

Lopez spent most of the 2022 season with Buffalo. He collected his first major-league hit on October 1, 2022, his 24th birthday, against the Boston Red Sox. Lopez played for the Canadian national baseball team in the 2023 World Baseball Classic.

References

External links

1998 births
Living people
Sportspeople from Santo Domingo
Major League Baseball players from the Dominican Republic
Dominican Republic expatriate baseball players in the United States
Dominican Republic emigrants to Canada
Major League Baseball infielders
Toronto Blue Jays players
Gulf Coast Blue Jays players
Bluefield Blue Jays players
Vancouver Canadians players
Lansing Lugnuts players
New Hampshire Fisher Cats players
Buffalo Bisons (minor league) players
Leones del Escogido players
Gigantes del Cibao players
Naturalized citizens of Canada
Canadian expatriate baseball players in the United States
2023 World Baseball Classic players